John Roxborough (aka John Rokysburgh, died 1509) was a Master of University College, Oxford, England.

Roxborough, from Durham, held parishes in Hampshire, Wiltshire, and Surrey. He was Senior Fellow at University College when he was appointed Master in 1487 or 1488.

References 

Year of birth missing
1509 deaths
People from Durham, England
16th-century English Roman Catholic priests
15th-century scholars
16th-century scholars
15th-century English Roman Catholic priests
Fellows of University College, Oxford
Masters of University College, Oxford
English priests